Station to Station is a 1976 album by David Bowie.

Station to Station may also refer to:

 "Station to Station" (song), title song of the 1976 David Bowie album
 Station to Station (2015 film), 2015 experimental film
 Station to Station (2021 film), 2021 psychological drama
 "Station to Station", a season 2 episode of Russian Doll

Telecommunications
Station-to-station, a method of operator-assisted telephone calls
Station-to-Station protocol, a cryptographic protocol

See also
Stations of the Cross, the devotion commemorating the Passion of Jesus Christ